En Todo Estaré (English: I'll Be In Everything) is the 15th studio album by Puerto Rican performer Chayanne. This album was released on August 25, 2014.

Track list

Reception

The album was well received by critics on AllMusic where it got a 3.5 star rating. It also received gold and platinum certifications in several countries in America such as Mexico and Chile.

Charts

Weekly charts

Year-end charts

Sales and certifications

See also
List of number-one Billboard Latin Albums from the 2010s
List of number-one albums of 2014 (Spain)

References

2014 albums
Chayanne albums
Sony Music Latin albums